Bonfils-Caleb Bimenyimana (born 21 November 1997) is a Burundian professional footballer who plays as a forward for South African Premier Division club Kaizer Chiefs and the Burundi national team.

Career

FK Pohronie
Bimenyimana had joined Slovak Super Liga club FK Pohronie in mid-August 2020, following a prolonged scouting by the club. He signed with the Žiar nad Hronom-based club for two years. He made his league debut at Štadión Antona Malatinského on 15 August 2020 starting in a 1–1 tie against Spartak Trnava. Trnava took the lead in the first ten minutes through Gergely Tumma before Bimenyimana equalised the score and set the final at 1–1 after an hour of play.

He also scored in the next game on 22 August 2020, in an upset home victory against Žilina. He scored the opening goal of the 2–1 win during the first half before being replaced by Patrik Abrahám, due to an injury, after 40 minutes. In the second half, Patrik Iľko equalised but Pohronie re-gained the lead and gained the win through Alieu Fadera. He achieved his last league goal in a 2–2 tie against iClinic Sereď on 19 September and two further goals three days earlier during a Cup fixture against lower division FK Rača.

Following this, Bimenyimana had failed to score in nine subsequent matches and departed from the club in January 2021.

Kaizer Chiefs
On 22 August 2022, Bimenyimana signed a two-year contract with South African club Kaizer Chiefs. On 17 September 2022, in his first start for the club, he scored two goals in a 2–1 league match win against Supersport United.

Personal life
According to his social media, Bimneyimana is a Christian.

References

External links
 
 Bonfils-Caleb Bimenyimana at Futbalnet

1997 births
Living people
Sportspeople from Bujumbura
Association football forwards
Burundian footballers
Burundi international footballers
Vital'O F.C. players
Rayon Sports F.C. players
FK RFS players
FK Atlantas players
FK Pohronie players
FC Kaisar players
Burundi Premier League players
Rwanda National Football League players
Latvian Higher League players
A Lyga players
Slovak Super Liga players
Kazakhstan Premier League players
Burundian expatriate footballers
Expatriate footballers in Rwanda
Burundian expatriate sportspeople in Rwanda
Expatriate footballers in Latvia
Burundian expatriate sportspeople in Latvia
Expatriate footballers in Lithuania
Burundian expatriate sportspeople in Lithuania
Expatriate footballers in Slovakia
Burundian expatriate sportspeople in Slovakia
Expatriate footballers in Kazakhstan
Burundian expatriate sportspeople in Kazakhstan
Burundian Christians